The Technical University of Civil Engineering of Bucharest is a public university in Bucharest, Romania, founded in 1948. It was formerly known as the Institute of Civil Engineering of Bucharest. 

UTCB is a member of the Romanian Alliance of Technical Universities (ARUT).

Academics
Technical University of Civil Engineering is organized into 7 faculties and one department. The university offers 4-year programmes, awarding the degree of Bachelor of Science (Engineer), and graduate/postgraduate programmes awarding the degrees of Master (2-year programmes) and Doctorate/PhD (3-year programmes).

References

Engineering universities and colleges in Romania
Technical University of Civil Engineering of Bucharest
Educational institutions established in 1948
1948 establishments in Romania